Gothda or Gothra may refer to the following places in India :

 Gothda (Gothra), a village of the former Kamadhia State, in Eastern Kathiawar (Gujarat), which was turned into a zamindari jagir for the princely Mir family
 Gothra, a village in the Dhod tehsil of Sikar district, in Rajasthan
 Litter Gothra, a village and former mehwa (petty princely (e)state) in Pandu, Rewa kantha, Gujarat